Sir William Rowley, 2nd Baronet (10 February 1761 – 20 October 1832) of Tendring Hall, Suffolk was an English Member of Parliament and High Sheriff.

He was the eldest son of Admiral Sir Joshua Rowley, 1st Baronet and educated at Harrow School from 1774. He succeeded his father the Tendring Hall and the baronetcy in 1790.

He joined the British Army and was a lieutenant and captain in the 96th Foot in 1780, transferring to the 3rd Foot Guards from 1782 to 1786. He was afterwards lieutenant-colonel commanding the Suffolk Volunteer Cavalry (in 1798).

He was elected MP for the county of Suffolk, sitting from 1812 to 1830 and was pricked High Sheriff of Suffolk for 1791–92.

He married in 1785, Susanna Edith, the daughter of Admiral Sir Robert Harland, 1st Baronet, of Sproughton, Suffolk. They had 5 sons and 6 daughters. He was succeeded by his eldest son, Vice-Admiral Sir Joshua Ricketts Rowley, 3rd Baronet.

References

1761 births
1832 deaths
People from Norfolk
People educated at Harrow School
Baronets in the Baronetage of Great Britain
Members of the Parliament of the United Kingdom for English constituencies
UK MPs 1812–1818
UK MPs 1818–1820
UK MPs 1820–1826
UK MPs 1826–1830
High Sheriffs of Suffolk